This is a list of populated places in Kilis Province, Turkey. The list is subdivided by the four districts of the province. The administrative center of each district is listed first for that district.

Kilis 
Kilis
Acar, Kilis
Akçabağlar, Kilis
Akıncı, Kilis
Alatepe, Kilis
Arpakesmez, Kilis
Başmağara, Kilis
Beşenli, Kilis
Beşikkaya, Kilis
Bozcayazı, Kilis
Bulamaçlı, Kilis
Büyükkonak, Kilis
Ceritler, Kilis
Çakallıpınar, Kilis
Çalkaya, Kilis
Çerçili, Kilis
Çörten, Kilis
Çukuroba, Kilis
Deliçay, Kilis
Deliosman, Kilis
Demirciler, Kilis
Demirışık, Kilis
Doğançay, Kilis
Dölek, Kilis
Duruca, Kilis
Göktaş, Kilis
Gözkaya, Kilis
Gülbaba, Kilis
Gümüşsuyu, Kilis
Güneşli, Kilis
Hıcıpoğlu, Kilis
Hisar, Kilis
İnanlı, Kilis
Kapdeğirmeni, Kilis
Karacaören, Kilis
Karaçavuş, Kilis
Karamelik, Kilis
Kocabeyli, Kilis
Kuskunkıran, Kilis
Kuzuini, Kilis
Küçükkonak, Kilis
Küplüce, Kilis
Güvenli, Kilis
Mağaracık, Kilis
Mehmetali, Kilis
Mısırcık, Kilis
Narlıca, Kilis
Oylum, Kilis
Saatli, Kilis
Süngütepe, Kilis
Tahtalı, Kilis
Tamburalı, Kilis
Topdağı, Kilis
Uzunlu, Kilis
Yavuzlu, Kilis

Elbeyli 
Elbeyli
Akçaağıl, Elbeyli
Alahan, Elbeyli
Aşağıbeylerbeyi, Elbeyli
Beşiriye, Elbeyli
Çankallı, Elbeyli
Çıldıroba, Elbeyli
Erikliyayla, Elbeyli
Geçerli, Elbeyli
Günece, Elbeyli
Güvendik, Elbeyli
Havuzluçam, Elbeyli
Kalbursait, Elbeyli
Karacurun, Elbeyli
Karaçağıl, Elbeyli
Kılcan, Elbeyli
Mercanlı, Elbeyli
Sağlıcak, Elbeyli
Selmincik, Elbeyli
Taşlıbakar, Elbeyli
Turanlı, Elbeyli
Uğurlar, Elbeyli
Yağızköy, Elbeyli
Yenideğirmen, Elbeyli

Musabeyli 
Musabeyli
Ağcakent, Musabeyli
Aşağıbademli, Musabeyli
Aşağıkalecik, Musabeyli
Balıklı, Musabeyli
Belentepe, Musabeyli
Bozkaya, Musabeyli
Çayıraltı, Musabeyli
Çınarköy, Musabeyli
Dorucak, Musabeyli
Dutluca, Musabeyli
Fericek, Musabeyli
Fırlaklı, Musabeyli
Geçitboyu, Musabeyli
Gökmusa, Musabeyli
Gözlüce, Musabeyli
Gündeğer, Musabeyli
Hacılar, Musabeyli
Hasancalı, Musabeyli
Haydarlar, Musabeyli
Hüseyinoğlu, Musabeyli
Karadut, Musabeyli
Karbeyaz, Musabeyli
Kayapınar, Musabeyli
Kaynaklı, Musabeyli
Kızılkent, Musabeyli
Koçcağız, Musabeyli
Kolpınar, Musabeyli
Kozlubağ, Musabeyli
Körahmethüyüğü, Musabeyli
Kurtaran, Musabeyli
Kürtüncü, Musabeyli
Madenyolu, Musabeyli
Sabanlı, Musabeyli
Şenlikçe, Musabeyli
Tahtalıkaradut, Musabeyli
Tokaçgemriği, Musabeyli
Topallar, Musabeyli
Uğurtepe, Musabeyli
Üçpınar, Musabeyli
Yastıca, Musabeyli
Yedigöz, Musabeyli
Yeşiloba, Musabeyli
Yukarıbademli, Musabeyli
Yukarıkalecik, Musabeyli
Yuvabaşı, Musabeyli
Zeytinbağı, Musabeyli

Polateli 

Polateli
Bağarası, Polateli
Bektaşoğlu, Polateli
Belenözü, Polateli
Dümbüllü, Polateli
Eğlen, Polateli
Kaymakam Kürşat Ağca, Polateli
Kızılgöl, Polateli
Ömercik, Polateli
Ömeroğlu, Polateli
Polatbey, Polateli
Söğütlü, Polateli
Taşlıalan, Polateli
Ürünlü, Polateli
Yeniyapan, Polateli
Yeniyurt, Polateli
Yeşilpınar, Polateli
Yılanca, Polateli

References 

List
Kilis